The 1991 Stevenage Borough Council election took place on 2 May 1991. This was on the same day as other local elections. One third of the council was up for election; the seats which were last contested in 1987. The Labour Party retained control of the council, which it had held continuously since its creation in 1973.

Overall results

|-bgcolor=#F6F6F6
| colspan=2 style="text-align: right; margin-right: 1em" | Total
| style="text-align: right;" | 13
| colspan=5 |
| style="text-align: right;" | 22,656
| style="text-align: right;" | 
|-
|colspan="11" bgcolor=""|
|-
| style="background:"|
| colspan="10"| Labour hold

All comparisons in seats and vote share are to the corresponding 1987 election.

Ward results

Bandley Hill

Bedwell Plash

Longmeadow

Martins Wood

Mobbsbury

Monkswood

Old Stevenage

Pin Green

Roebuck

St Nicholas

Shephall

Symonds Green

Wellfield

References

1991
1991 English local elections
1990s in Hertfordshire